Opportunism is the practice of taking advantage of circumstances – with little regard for principles or with what the consequences are for others. Opportunist actions are expedient actions guided primarily by self-interested motives. The term can be applied to individual humans and living organisms, groups, organizations, styles, behaviors, and trends.

Opportunism or "opportunistic behaviour" is an important concept in such fields of study as biology, transaction cost economics, game theory, ethics, psychology, sociology and politics.

Definitions
Opportunism is the conscious policy and practice of taking advantage of circumstances.

Although in many societies opportunism often has a strong negative moral connotation, it may also be defined more neutrally as putting self-interest before other interests when there is an opportunity to do so, or flexibly adapting to changing circumstances to maximize self-interest (though usually in a way that negates some principle previously followed).

Opportunism is sometimes defined as the ability to capitalize on the mistakes of others: to exploit opportunities created by the errors, weaknesses or distractions of opponents to one's own advantage.

Taking a realistic or practical approach to a problem can involve "weak" forms of opportunism. For the sake of doing something that will work, or that successfully solves the problem, a previously agreed principle is knowingly compromised or disregarded - with the justification that alternative actions would, overall, have a worse effect.

In choosing or seizing  opportunities, human opportunism is most likely to occur where:

 People can make the most gains at the least cost to themselves.
 Relevant internal or external controls on their behavior are absent.
 People are pressured to choose and act.

Criticism of opportunism usually refers to a situation where beliefs and principles are tested or challenged.

Human opportunism should not be confused with "seeking opportunities", or "making use of opportunities when they arise". Opportunism refers to a specific way of responding to opportunities, which involves the element of self-interestedness and disregard for relevant (ethical) principles, or for intended or previously agreed goals, or for the shared concerns of a group.

However, opportunism is sometimes also redefined by businessmen simply as "the theory of discovering and pursuing opportunities". According to this redefinition, "opportunism" is a euphemism for "entrepreneurship".

Etymology
In the early 19th century, the term "opportunist" as a noun or adjective was already known and used in several European languages, but initially, it rarely referred to political processes or to a political tendency. The English term "opportunism" is possibly borrowed originally from the Italian expression opportunismo. In 19th-century Italian politics, it meant "exploiting the prevailing circumstances or opportunities to gain an immediate advantage for oneself or one's own group". However, it is more likely that the English expression was directly borrowed from the French term, when it began to refer specifically to the opportunist Republicans, since the term first entered the English language in the early 1870s. In this sense the meaning "opportunism" has mutated: from those who claimed to advocate a principle (in the original French case, an amnesty for the Communards) but said that the time was not yet "opportune", to what may be thought of as the opposite - those who act without principle.

In Latin, opportunus means opportune or favourable (opportunitas = opportunity); the word itself is a contraction of ob portus ("toward the harbour/entrance") or oppositum portus ("facing the harbour/entrance").

Moral connotations

As a style of human behavior, opportunism has the connotation of a lack of integrity, or doing something that is out of character (inconsistent). The underlying thought is that the price of the unrestrained pursuit of selfishness is behavioral inconsistency. Thus, opportunism involves compromising some or other principles normally upheld. However, the boundary between "legitimate self-interest" and "undesirable (or anti-social) selfishness" can be difficult to define; the definition relies on perspective.

Some people regard an opportunist stance positively as a legitimate choice. Thus, the British Conservative statesman Stanley Baldwin is supposed to have quipped:

In opportunism, life is viewed as holding an infinite amount of opportunity, where the pattern of one's responses to each defines their identity. It can also be viewed as striving to realize or express certain principles. However, the moral dilemma implied by opportunism concerns the conflict of self-interest with the interests of others, or with following a principle: either to do what one wants or to do "what is the right thing to do". Thus, substantively, opportunism refers to  the acting on opportunities in a self-interested, biased or one-sided manner that conflicts or contrasts in some way with one or more general rule, law, norm, or principle.

The fact that the self-interested action evokes this conflict, implies that the tendency to use opportunities to advantage is excessive or improper, the corollary being a deficiency of character or lack of propriety. Hence the term opportunism often has the pejorative connotation. Moralists may have a distaste for opportunism, insofar as opportunism implies the violation of a moral principle.

Human behaviour

In human behavior, opportunism concerns the relationship between people's actions, and their basic principles when faced with opportunities and challenges. The opportunist seeks to gain a personal advantage when an opportunity presents itself, putting self-interest ahead of some other interest, in a way contrary either to a previously established principle or another principle that ought to have higher priority. Hence opportunist behavior is usually regarded at least as questionable or dubious, and at most as unjustifiable or completely illegitimate. Opportunism is regarded as unhealthy, as a disorder or as a character deficiency, if selfishly pursuing an opportunity is blatantly anti-social (involves disregard for the needs, wishes and interests of others). However, behavior can also be regarded as "opportunist" by scholars without any particular moral evaluation being made or implied (simply as a type of self-interested behavior).

The sociology and psychology of human opportunism is related to the study of gambling behavior, and what kind of motivation and organizational culture is involved. Both the element of risk and opportunity play a role. To be opportunist in behavior, a person or group must:

refuse to take a risk that would reduce the influence, support, wealth or popularity, even although taking the risk is consistent with the principles the person or group uphold.
take a risk for the purpose of gaining/maintaining influence, support, wealth or popularity, although taking this risk is inconsistent with the principles being espoused.
take advantage of an opportunity to increase influence, support, wealth or popularity, although it is not consistent with the principles being upheld.
refuse to respond to an opportunity, only because responding to it might forfeit influence, support, wealth or popularity, even although taking the opportunity would in truth be consistent with the principles being subscribed to.

Thus, the opportunity exploited for selfish ends can itself exist either because an action is taken, or because of deliberate inaction (when action should really have been taken). The propensity to engage in such kinds of behaviours depends a great deal on the presence or absence of personal characteristics such as integrity, moral character, personal insight or self-awareness, personal flexibility and balance. It also depends on the ability to judge the consequences of different courses of action correctly. Strong emotions and desires may also play a role, and much may depend on how permissive a person, group or organization is (see permissive society). These factors influence the capacity to know "where to draw the line" appropriately, and regulate one's own behavior so that it remains consistent. Much also depends on the beliefs people happen to have about themselves and the world they live in, and on the morale of an organization.

An opportunist's motive always involves an element of selfishness. Psychologically, it follows that opportunism always assumes a basic ability to make one's own choices, and decide to act in a way that serves one's own interest. In turn, that presupposes at least some basic self-motivation, inner direction, inventiveness, and behavioral freedom; subjectively, an opportunist must at least be able to recognize and respond to opportunities when they are there.

Eight main contexts

Personalities and beliefs are shaped by the specific environment where they form. It is likely that the possibilities for opportunist behavior are promoted in contexts where there is not only an incentive to engage in them, but also where it is also extremely difficult for some reason to remain behaviourally consistent, or where ordinary constraints on behavior are lacking. In that case, opportunist behavior does not seem to have much adverse effect or consequence, at least in the short term, compared to the much greater benefits of engaging in it. Eight main contexts are referred to in the literature:

Power: according to Lord Acton's famous dictum, "all power corrupts, and absolute power corrupts absolutely". If there are only weak sanctions against unprincipled behavior, this creates a setting where opportunist behavior can flourish, and if the positions of people are very unequal (in terms of power, wealth, status, knowledge or strength) the possibility exists that some will take advantage of the disadvantage of others.
Advantages: the prevalence of opportunist behavior is likely to be influenced by the perception that the pay-off or advantage of engaging in it, outweighs possible disadvantages or penalties. Opportunism is facilitated if the situation permits an actor to appropriate the gains or advantages to be had from activity to themselves while shifting the costs, blame and disadvantages to others. This may be regarded as unfair competition.
Predicaments: The propensity of opportunist behavior is influenced by the general life-situations that people find themselves in. If one's own position is strong and secure, it may be much easier to be an opportunist – because if it would result in losses and failures, those losses and failures can be easily sustained given the resources available. Conversely, a person's existence may be so precarious, that he has "nothing to lose" by seizing any opportunity available to benefit himself. Opportunist behavior can be self-reinforcing: if there is a lot of opportunism, then not to be opportunist oneself would mean that competitors take advantage of that, and therefore people can be forced into an opportunist role as a defensive strategy.
Resources: if a new bonanza (an abundantly available resource, or market) is discovered, accessible or opened up, people may try to "grab what they can" without regard to the consequences for others, perhaps with the thought that if they do not avail themselves of this opportunity, others will (and that if others do, it disadvantages them). Examples might be a gold rush and the tragedy of the commons. In this case, opportunist behavior may be facilitated, especially if precise rules for how a resource should be distributed are lacking, or if it is unclear who really owns it, or if proper use cannot be enforced.
Information: opportunism is facilitated in the absence of relevant information, knowledge or awareness about the interests and values involved in a situation or activity, making it difficult to identify and judge all the consequences in pursuing an opportunity. This could be due to deliberate disinformation. Self-interest may be followed because it is unclear or undecided what other interests are at stake, or because a shared morality is lacking. If the situation is one where shared rules are lacking, where it is quite uncertain what the relevant rule to apply is, or where everything is very uncertain or chaotic, plenty of scopes exists for opportunist behavior.
Competition: in a situation of intense conflict, competition or war, it may be that people will do anything to survive, win, retain support, or defend themselves, never mind the principles, ideals or beliefs they had. Ordinary laws and "rules of the game" break down, creating new opportunities for those positioned to take advantage of them.
Awareness: if people are for some or other reason deceiving themselves about the real consequences of their actions, they are more likely to initiate or condone opportunist behaviour; if they were more aware, that wouldn't happen to the same extent. Opportunism is facilitated if for any reason there is a low level of awareness that it is happening. Perceptions of the strengths and vulnerabilities of others and oneself may play an important role.
Success: opportunism often involves the presence of a very strong desire to be popular, to exercise influence or to succeed in making gains. That motivation can promote the urge to win something "by any means necessary", even if it means to "cut corners" and do things not consistent with relevant principles. If people are for some reason motivated "to do anything at all to achieve success", they are more likely to engage in opportunist behavior for that very reason.

Five main organizational influences

Opportunist behavior is also strongly influenced by the organizational context in which it occurs.

Controls: some organizations may have a code of behavior or set of rules that makes opportunist behavior difficult because organizational policy sets clear and immediate penalties for such behavior. Other organizations may be so loosely structured and so lacking in controls and sanctions regulating behaviour, that opportunism becomes almost unavoidable.
Rationale: much depends on whether the organization really has a principled basis for its activities to start out with (a clearly defined, agreed understanding about the relationship between goals and the means to achieve them). Lacking such a principled foundation, the organization may find itself constantly trying to compensate for both opportunist errors and factional errors.
Norms and values: behavior that some organizations regard as "opportunist" may be perfectly acceptable in others, or tolerated as normal. Sometimes expectations of behavior are made explicit by the organization with the aid of formal rules communicated to members. Sometimes they are only implicit and informal - possibly because formal rules are not easy to formulate, or to enforce, or because it is assumed that members understand and share relevant norms and values.
Size: in general, the larger an organization is in terms of members, the more scope its members have to engage in opportunist behavior, since the larger it is, the less individual members are practically able to check or control the behavior of many other members, and the more possibility there is that groups of members will develop self-serving interests that deviate from the stated goals of the organization.
Purpose: the scope for opportunism depends very much on the nature and goals of the organization itself, and on the strength and integrity of its leadership. If for example, the organization sets itself the task to exploit risks and opportunities to advantage, then no matter what its size is, it tends to facilitate opportunist behavior. If, on the other hand, the aim of the organization is to carefully conserve a state of affairs or belief system, this is much less likely to attract opportunists.

Use of the term in specific areas

Professional

In professional ethics, the concept of opportunism plays a role in defining criteria for professional integrity. In providing a service, a professional may have personal discretion (choice or leeway) about how to provide the service. Professionals may, to a great extent, make their own judgements, interpretations, and decisions about the exact approach to take—without an explicit rule that they must perform in a specific way. Such a situation can be exploited with opportunist motives that are contrary to the stated ethics of a profession. Consequently, it becomes necessary—for the sake of preserving professional integrity—to explicate "guiding norms" that define the boundaries of acceptable practice, or to divide up roles in such a way that different people in an organization can effectively check and control what their colleagues actually do ("to keep them honest").

Intellectual

The term intellectual opportunism—the pursuit of intellectual opportunities with a selfish, ulterior motive not consistent with relevant principles—refers to certain self-serving tendencies of the human intellect, often involving professional producers and disseminators of ideas, who work with idea-formation all the time. The phenomenon of intellectual opportunism is frequently associated by its critics with careerism. When human knowledge becomes a tradeable good in a market of ideas, all sorts of opportunities arise for huckstering, swindling, haggling and hustling with information in ways which are regarded as unprincipled, dubious or involve deceit of some sort.

The intellectual opportunist adapts his intellectual concerns, pursuits and utterances to "fit with the trend/fashion" or "fit the situation" or "with what sells" – with the (ulterior) motive of gaining personal popularity/support, protecting intellectual coherence, obtaining personal credit, acquiring privilege or status, persuading others, ingratiating himself, taking advantage or making money. Normally this assumes some degree of intellectual flexibility, agility or persuasiveness.

Sexual

Sexual opportunism is the selfish pursuit of sexual opportunities for their own sake when they arise, often with the negative moral connotation that in some way it "takes advantage" of others, or "makes use" of, or "exploits", other persons for sexual purposes. Sexual opportunism is sometimes also defined as the use of sexual favors for selfish purposes quite unrelated to the sexual activity, in which case taking a sexual opportunity is merely the  means to achieve a quite different purpose, for example, to advance one's career or obtain status or money. This may be accepted or tolerated, or it may be criticized because the concerns of others are not adequately taken into consideration.

To the extent that the feelings, wishes, intentions, purposes, interests or norms of others are not adequately considered in the pursuit of sexual gratification, it then conflicts with some or other principle for appropriate behavior, and it may involve deceit or dishonesty (for example, the deliberate exploitation of sexual innocence). In that case, sexual opportunist is considered to lack sexual and/or personal integrity. In a clinical or scientific sense, sexual opportunism is often straightforwardly described as observable sexual promiscuity or the observable propensity to engage in casual sex,  whatever the motive.

Evolutionary

In the theory of evolution, "evolutionary opportunism" refers to a specific pattern of development in the history of a species. The behavior, culture or body part of a species that long ago evolved to serve a particular purpose or function may subsequently lend itself to a very  different positive purpose or function that helps the species to survive. Thus, in a new stage of evolution, a long-existing behavior, culture, or physical characteristic can respond to a wholly new opportunity and acquire a new role. It turns out to have new advantages or potential benefits the species previously never used—and, therefore, the species retains an adaptation even if the original purpose it served is long gone.

Biological

In biology, an opportunist organism is generally defined as a species that can live and thrive in variable environmental conditions, and sustain itself from a number of different food sources, or can rapidly take advantage of favorable conditions when they arise, because the species is behaviorally sufficiently flexible. Such species can for example postpone reproduction, or stay dormant, until conditions make growth and reproduction possible. In the biological disciplines, opportunistic behavior is studied in fields such as evolutionary biology, ecology, epidemiology, and etiology, where moral or judgmental overtones do not apply (see also opportunistic pathogens, opportunistic predation, phoresis, and parasitism).

In microbiology, opportunism refers to the ability of a normally non-pathogenic microorganism to act as a pathogen in certain circumstances.  Opportunist micro-organisms (such as bacteria, viruses, fungi, and protozoa) are ones that, when they invade the host organism, can cause infection in the host organism, but cause real disease only if the natural defenses, resistance or immune system of the host organism are lowered (see opportunistic infection). In macrobiology, opportunist behaviour by an organism generally means that it is able to seize and use diverse opportunities in its environment to survive and grow. If one single opportunity or need occurs, the organism can "improvise" a response to it with whatever resources it has available, even if what it can do is not the best possible strategy.

Some animals also show this behavior for group-foraging. In other words, they try to optimize the feeding intake of their colony. The Australian stingless bee Tetragonula carbonaria, for instance, has several workers search for an area full of rich resources, and will then recruit heavily in this area until the resources are depleted."

Political

The term "opportunism" is often used in politics and political science, and by activists campaigning for a cause. The political philosophy of Niccolò Machiavelli as described in The Prince is often regarded as a classic manual of opportunist scheming. Political opportunism is interpreted in different ways, but usually refers to one or more of the following:

a political style of aiming to increase one's political influence at almost any price, or a political style that involves seizing every and any opportunity to extend political influence, whenever such opportunities arise.
The practice of abandoning or compromising, in reality, some important political principles that were previously held, in the process of trying to increase one's political power and influence.
a trend of thought, or a political tendency, seeking to make political capital out of situations with the main aim being that of gaining more influence, prestige or support, instead of truly winning people over to a principled position or improving their political understanding.
believing that there is much more at work behind the scenes for the combining of alliances, making of pacts and signing of agreements for a cause.
having experiencing suffering for a political cause, without real political positions and/or beliefs being revealed in the process, though with or without critique.

Typically, opportunist political behavior is criticized for being short-sighted or narrow-minded. Most politicians are "opportunists" to some extent at least (they aim to use political opportunities creatively to their advantage, and have to try new initiatives), but the controversies surrounding the concept concern the exact relationship between "seizing a political opportunity" and the political principles being espoused. The term "political opportunism" is often used in a pejorative sense, mainly because it connotes the abandonment of principles or compromising political goals. Political integrity typically demands an appropriate combination of principled positions and political flexibility that produces a morally consistent behavior in specific circumstances. There are four main sources of political opportunism: suicide (a specific political methodology that is applied to maintain or increase political influence), populism, risk management, and "means become ends".

Economic

There exists no agreed general, scientific definition or theory of economic opportunism; the literature usually considers only specific cases and contexts. Market trade supplies no universal morality of its own, except the law of contract and basic practical requirements to settle transactions, while at the same time legal rules, however precise in their formulation, cannot control every detail of transactions and the interpretation (or implications) thereof. Since economic opportunism must be assessed against some relevant norm or principle, controversy about what that norm or principle should be, makes a general definition difficult.

Market trade is compatible with a great variety of moral norms, religions, and political systems, and indeed supporters of the free market claim that this is exactly its advantage: people can choose their own values, buying and selling as they wish within a basic legal framework accepted by all. People would not normally trade, if they did not expect to gain something by it; the fact that they do trade normally presupposes at least a respect for the basic rights of the party being traded with. Nevertheless, the gains or benefits of trading activity (and indeed the losses), although entirely legal, might be distributed very unequally or in ways not anticipated by previous understandings, and thus accusations of "economic opportunism" can arise nevertheless in many different settings. If this is the case, relevant trading obligations (or civil obligations) are usually considered as not being (fully) met or honored, in the pursuit of economic self-interest. Greed is frequently mentioned as a primary motive for economic opportunism.

Glenn R. Parker claims that the five most discussed examples of economic' opportunism are:

adverse selection
moral hazard
last-period exploitation, when it is known that competitors or stakeholders are not able to respond to a suitably timed selfish action.
reneging (in contracts), where a contractual agreement, promise, intention or understanding of a deal is not fully honored by a party to the contract, for selfish motives, because it is possible "to get away with it" and/or because there is an incentive to do so.
shirking, involving some kind of negligence, or failure to acquit oneself of duty (or a responsibility) previously agreed or implied (see also efficiency wages).

In transaction cost economics, opportunism means self-interest seeking with guile, involving some kind of deliberate deceit and the absence of moral restraint. It could involve deliberately withholding or distorting important business information, shirking (doing less work than agreed), or failing to fulfill formal or informal promises and obligations. It occurs in trading activities especially where rules and sanctions are lacking, and where the opportunist actor has great power to influence an outcome by the attitude he assumes in practice. However, others argue that this reflects a narrow view of economic opportunism, because there are many more ways that economic actors can take selfish advantage of other economic actors, even if they do not violate the law. The critics of opportunism also note that opportunism is a hard to capture concept in empirical studies. Individuals are unlikely to answer truthfully questions about opportunism that makes an “unflattering behavioral assumption” (Williamson, 1995, p. 29) about how individuals behave when transacting.

Game theory

In game theory, opportunism concerns the contradictory relationships between altruistic and self-interested behaviour, where the different kinds of common and sectional interests existing in a situation are used mainly to make gains for oneself. If some actors in a game are placed at a disadvantage in some way, for any reason, it becomes an opportunity for other actors to capitalize on that fact, by using the disadvantage of others to improve their own position – under conditions where actors both compete and cooperate in different areas. Two classic cases discussed in game theory where opportunism is often involved are the free rider problem and the prisoner's dilemma. In this game-theoretical sense, Paul Seabright defines opportunism as "the behaviour of those who seek to benefit from the efforts of others without contributing anything themselves." Game theory can, for example, model the effects of information asymmetry, where people have unequal access to relevant information, so that those who "do know" can take advantage of those who "don't know".

From a game-theoretical perspective, opportunism is objectively a "problem", if the pursuit of self-interest – in conflict with other interests at stake – has an undesirable or unwanted result for some actors or most of them. However, in principle examples could also be constructed where opportunist behaviour unintentionally serves other, broader interests (such as when, in their rush to take selfish advantage of a situation, the opportunist actors create more opportunities for other actors at the same time – the "bandwaggon" or "food chain" effect; see also Pareto optimality). In game theory, therefore, opportunism is not defined as being intrinsically and necessarily always a good thing or a bad thing; it could be either. Usually though, it is assumed, that the game theorist is able to "stand outside" the different interests being studied, to view the situation objectively – in a detached, uninvolved, impartial and unbiased way.

Kenneth Arrow explains that markets require trust to operate effectively, but that trust may not be spontaneously generated by market activity:

Social

Social opportunism refers to the use of opportunities for social contact only for selfish purposes or motives. Because it is only selfish, the implication is usually that obligations to other participants in the given social setting are not (fully) met or honoured. The social opportunist participates in a group, cooperates with it or associates with it, not primarily because he wants to "contribute", give or share something to the group, or because he values being part of it as an intrinsic good, but only because he wants to get some advantage out of the participation for himself. Consequently, the participation by the opportunist is substantively only a "means" that serves some other, selfish purpose. This may be tolerated, to the extent that the selfish purpose of the opportunist is compatible with, or does not conflict with, the goals and intentions of the group. It may be regarded as undesirable and unwanted, or indeed a breach of trust or good faith, if that is not the case.

Groups, gatherings, associations, or organizations that operate on the basis of voluntary or involuntary association, or in an atmosphere of mutual trust, may provide resources or contacts to their participants that are:
 Provided and shared only because of their cooperation, or being together.
 Conditional on actually participating in the social setting.

Thus, to use those resources or contacts for some selfish aim, paradoxically the social opportunist necessarily has to gain entry, join in and participate socially; there is no other way to gain access to or extract what he wants for himself.  Some social groupings may welcome social opportunists, because they can serve a useful function, or can be persuaded (perhaps with group pressure) to change their ways through participation. Other social groupings may try to prevent social opportunism, by imposing strict preconditions of participation to ward off opportunists, or with the aid of rules prohibiting opportunist behaviour.

Marxist theory
Karl Marx provided no substantive theory of opportunism; insofar as he used the term, he meant a tactic of convenience or expediency used for self-serving motives, involving some or other kind of political, economic or intellectual trick.  Nevertheless, some Marxists claim that Marx's theory of capitalism does imply a substantive theory of opportunism. Its main claim is that opportunism is not simply an aberration or impediment to the efficient functioning of capitalism, but an integral and necessary characteristic of it; capitalist market activity promotes opportunist moves in all sorts of ways.  Five kinds of factors are usually cited:

Capitalist society constantly reorganizes the structure of human cooperation, so that, more and more, people produce things they do not need themselves, or that are surplus to their own requirements, and can therefore be appropriated by others for personal gain. This causes alienation, and it creates a specific motivational structure. It promotes an inability to respond adequately to the needs of others except in the form of self-interested trade-offs.
Although people necessarily have to cooperate to survive, the way they go about this is highly contradictory, and involves "character masks", because there is also constant competition among individuals, businesses and social classes for money, power and prestige. They all have different interests, and are likely to take advantage of others, when they sense they can get away with it. This competition is rarely a level playing field.
Capitalist society is itself founded on the exploitation of the labour of others and on unequal exchange. This is enabled by the ownership or control of assets, money and credit that investors use to extract unearned income from the work of others who have to sell their work capacity to survive. It makes it possible for private owners of capital to claim more resources than they have themselves produced or contributed to society. Owning property is rewarded more and more, and working to create it is rewarded less and less.
Regulating all the conflicting interests and values, the capitalist state enforces the constraints of a legal system, but this legal system splits moral value and economic value into separate compartments, as well as splitting public and private spheres. While it formally regards all citizens as equal and free, in reality people are very unequally positioned with respect to their social status, power, knowledge and wealth, and consequently also their freedoms. Information asymmetry is not simply a problem in trade, but occurs in every sphere of life, and thus some capitalize on the ignorance of others.
Capitalist society is of itself aimless and amorphous with regard to the purposes of human life, lacking any shared, consensual ethic. Any candidate for such an ethic, such as a religion, is only as influential as the power that exists to assert it, but even so its norms are constantly contradicted in practice. Capitalism makes human development conditional on the unbridled pursuit of self-enrichment. This promotes personal qualities such as egoism and selfishness, where people try to "privatize the gains and socialize the losses."

Taken together, these five factors make it difficult for any individual or group to reconcile self-interest with the general interest, genuinely and durably, and it means that moral double standards are very pervasive.  In turn, that creates a total environment where opportunism can flourish – including within the socialist movement. In fact, "opportunism" as a political term began to be used widely among Marxists, when the parliamentarians from the leading party of the Second International, the German Social Democratic Party, voted in favour of the war credits necessary at the beginning of World War I.  Marxist critics argued that this policy was a total abandonment of socialist principles, especially the principle of anti-militarism and the international solidarity of the working class. Since that time, opportunism has been often defined by Marxists as a policy that puts special interests ahead of the interests of the working class

Legal

Legal opportunism is a term coined in a 2015 article in the Journal of Business Research to describe litigation following an IPO to recover potential losses after negative stock developments, regardless of the legal merits of the claim.

Spiritual

Spiritual opportunism refers to the exploitation of spiritual ideas (or of the spirituality of others, or of spiritual authority): for personal gain, partisan interests or selfish motives. Usually the implication is that doing so is unprincipled in some way, although it may cause no harm and involve no abuse. In other words, religion becomes a means to achieve something that is alien to it, or things are projected into religion that do not belong there.

If a religious authority acquires influence over the "hearts and minds" of people who are believers in a religion, and therefore can "tap into" the most intimate and deepest-felt concerns of believers, it can also gain immense power from that. This power can be used in a self-interested manner, exploiting opportunities to benefit the position of the religious authority or its supporters in society. This could be considered as inconsistent with the real intentions of the religious belief, or it might show lack of respect for the spiritual autonomy of others. The "good faith" of people is then taken advantage of, in ways that involve some kind of deceit, or some dubious, selfish motive.

The term spiritual opportunism is also used in the sense of casting around for suitable spiritual beliefs  borrowed and cobbled together in some way to justify, condemn or "make sense of" particular ways of behaving, usually with some partisan or ulterior motive. This may not be abusive, but it often gives rise to criticisms or accusations that the given spiritual beliefs:

are not an organic, sincere or authentic expression of the real nature of the people who contrived them.
do not really express what people's lives are about, but are in some way an "artificial add-on".
lack any deeper principled foundation, and are more an "eclectic, self-serving concoction"
are made to serve partisan interests, contrary to the real intention of the beliefs.

Supporters of traditional religions such as Christianity, Islam, Hinduism or Buddhism sometimes complain that people (such as New Age enthusiasts) seek out spiritual beliefs that serve only themselves, as a form of "spiritual opportunism". Such complaints are often highly controversial, because people are considered to have the right to their own spiritual beliefs (they may not have that right, to the extent that they are socially excluded unless they profess certain spiritual beliefs, but they may only subscribe "formally" or "outwardly" to them).

Spiritual opportunism sometimes refers also to the practice of proselytizing one's spiritual beliefs when any opportunity to do so arises, for the purpose of winning over, or persuading others, about the superiority of these beliefs. In this context, the spiritual opportunist may engage in various actions, themselves not directly related to the spiritual beliefs, with the specific aim of convincing others of the superiority of his own belief system – it may effectively amount to "buying their support".

See also
Business opportunity
Corruption
Enlightened self-interest
IndividualismJeitinho brasileiro''
Meritocracy
Opportunity cost
Positive accounting

References

 
Human behavior
Political terminology
Psychological attitude